Chen Qizhi (December 1925 – 15 January 2023) was a lieutenant general (zhongjiang) of the People's Liberation Army (PLA) who served as president of National University of Defense Technology from 1990 to 1994. He was a delegate to the 4th and 5th National People's Congress.

Biography
Chen was born in Chengdu, Sichuan, in December 1925, during the Republic of China. After graduating from National Central University (now Nanjing University) in 1948, he joined the faculty of PLA Military Engineering College. He joined the Chinese Communist Party (CCP) in 1954. In June 1990, he became  president of National University of Defense Technology, and served until February 1994.

Chen was promoted to the rank of major general (shaojiang) in 1988 and lieutenant general (zhongjiang) in 1993.

Chen died on 15 January 2023, at the age of 97.

References

1925 births
2023 deaths
People from Chengdu
Academic staff of the National University of Defense Technology
Presidents of the National University of Defense Technology
People's Liberation Army generals from Sichuan
People's Republic of China politicians from Sichuan
Chinese Communist Party politicians from Sichuan
Delegates to the 4th National People's Congress
Delegates to the 5th National People's Congress